Beauregard Creek is a stream located in the U.S. state of California. It is located in Santa Clara County.

References

Rivers of Northern California
Rivers of Santa Clara County, California